Opogona isotalanta is a moth of the family Tineidae. It is found in Sri Lanka.

References

Opogona
Moths described in 1930